The Multispectral Scanner (MSS) is one of the Earth's observing sensors introduced in the Landsat program. A Multispectral Scanner was placed aboard each of the first five Landsat satellites.

The scanner was designed at Hughes Aerospace by Virginia Norwood. Her design called for a six band scanner, but the first one launched had only four bands. For her work on the design Norwood is called "The Mother of Landsat."

MSS Technical Specifications

Notes

External links
 NASA Multispectral Scanner page

Satellite imaging sensors